Marke is a submunicipality of the city of Kortrijk, Belgium. It is part of the urban area of this city. As of 2012 it had a population of 7,933. It is the second largest part of Kortrijk.

External link

Sub-municipalities of Kortrijk
Populated places in West Flanders